Fegimanra is a small genus of trees in the subfamily Anacardioideae of the cashew and sumac family Anacardiaceae. They grow naturally in west and west-central tropical Africa.

Species
The Plant List and Catalogue of Life recognise 3 accepted species:
 Fegimanra acuminatissima 
 Fegimanra africana 
 Fegimanra afzelii

References

Anacardiaceae
Anacardiaceae genera